The Khedive's Sudan Medal was a campaign medal awarded by the Khedivate of Egypt for service in the Anglo-Egyptian Sudan. Established in 1911 by the Khedive, this medal replaced the earlier Khedive's Sudan Medal (1897) and was superseded by the Sudan Defence Force General Service Medal (1933).

Award criteria
The medal was awarded for minor operations in the Sudan to members of the Egyptian Army, including Sudanese battalions. Recipients included a number of British Army officers seconded to the Egyptian Army. It was issued in silver with clasps to combatants and without a clasp to non-combatants. Camp followers, such as porters and grooms, received the medal in bronze without a clasp.

While no complete British Army unit took part in any qualifying campaign, a 48 strong British Army Maxim Gun detachment drawn from a number of different regiments received the Durfur 1916 clasp, while the medal without clasp was awarded to a camel corps company manned by the Royal Warwickshire Regiment, in reserve during this campaign. A number of members of the Royal Flying Corps received the medal with the Durfur 1916 and Fasher clasps, while about thirty members of the Royal Air Force received the Garjak Nuer clasp.

Appearance
The medal is circular, 39 millimetres in diameter, and made of silver or bronze. The obverse bears the Arabic cypher of the Khedive, and the Hijri year of its establishment. The medal awarded in 1911 bears the cypher of Khedive Abba Hilmi, while that from 1918 shows the cypher of the Sultan Hussain Kamil. The reverse depicts a lion standing on a plinth bearing the word SUDAN with, behind, the sun rising above the flowing River Nile.The medal hangs from a straight bar suspension, the 32 millimetre wide watered ribbon being black with thin red and green stripes on each side.The medal was issued unnamed, except for a few to British recipients that were named in small impressed capitals.

Clasps
The medal was awarded with sixteen clasps inscribed in both English and Arabic, the largest number issued with one medal being five. Bronze medals were awarded without a clasp.

Atwot
Southern Kerdofan 1910
Sudan 1912
Mandal
Miri
Zeraf 1913-1914
Mongalla 1915-1916
Durfur 1916
Fasher
Lau-Nuer
Nyima 1917-1918
Atwot 1918
Aliab Dinka
Garjak Nuer
Nyala
Darpur 1921

References

External links 
 Medal roll held by The National Archives
 Online Medals: Medal Encyclopaedia. Khedive’s Sudan Medal 1910

Orders, decorations, and medals of Egypt
Awards established in 1911
1911 establishments in Egypt
Orders, decorations, and medals of Sudan